The Metropolitan Area of San Salvador (Área Metropolitana de San Salvador or AMSS) is a metropolitan area formed by San Salvador, the capital of El Salvador, and thirteen of its surrounding municipalities. It was instituted in 1993 through Legislative Decree No. 732 of the Law on Territorial Development and the Metropolitan Area of San Salvador and neighboring municipalities. The Act defines that, based on their urban development, these cities form a single urban unit.

Since 1990, it was felt that urban development in the Municipality of San Salvador and neighboring municipalities was having a remarkable growth, and even be defined as a big city. This situation required the planning and control of urban development in these municipalities and their conformation as a metropolitan area.

Currently, the AMSS constitutes the directional center of the country in political, financial, economic and cultural life. The most recently published official population projections for El Salvador forecasted the combined population of the fourteen municipalities at 1,767,102 in 2015, which would constitute 27.4% of the country's projected 6,460,271 inhabitants.

Municipalities
San Salvador - Capital of El Salvador.
Antiguo Cuscatlan - 4 kilometers southwest of San Salvador.
Santa Tecla - 9 kilometers southwest of San Salvador.
San Marcos - 6 kilometers south of San Salvador.
Soyapango - 6 kilometers east of San Salvador.
Ilopango - 8 kilometers east.
San Martin - 15 kilometers east.
Tonacatepeque - 12 kilometers north east.
Ciudad Delgado - 4 kilometers north east.
Cuscatancingo - 4 kilometers north.
Mejicanos- 5 kilometers north.
Apopa - 11 kilometers north.
Nejapa-13 kilometers north.
Ayutuxtepeque - 7 kilometers north.

References

San Salvador